The tenth season of the American police procedural television series Chicago P.D. premiered on September 21, 2022, on NBC, for the 2022–23 television season.

Chicago P.D. revolves around the members of the Intelligence Unit of the 21st District of the Chicago Police Department. The season stars Jason Beghe, Jesse Lee Soffer, Tracy Spiridakos, Marina Squerciati, Patrick John Flueger, LaRoyce Hawkins, Benjamin Levy Aguilar, and Amy Morton. Aguilar joined the series prior to the season premiere, after guest-starring in an episode of the previous season, while Soffer departed the series following the third episode. This season also includes the 200th episode of the series.

Jason Beghe who plays Hank Voight is now credited as an Executive Producer.

Cast and characters

Main 
 Jason Beghe as Sergeant Henry "Hank" Voight
 Jesse Lee Soffer as Detective Jay Halstead
 Tracy Spiridakos as Detective Hailey Upton
 Marina Squerciati as Officer Kim Burgess
 Patrick John Flueger as Officer Adam Ruzek
 LaRoyce Hawkins as Officer Kevin Atwater
 Benjamin Levy Aguilar as Officer Dante Torres
 Amy Morton as Desk Sergeant Trudy Platt

Guest 
 Michael Gaston as Chief Patrick O'Neal

Crossover 
 Nick Gehlfuss as Dr. William "Will" Halstead

Episodes

Production

Development 
On February 27, 2020, it was announced that NBC had renewed Chicago P.D. through a tenth season. The season is set to contain the two-hundredth episode of the series.

Casting 
In July 2022, it was reported by Deadline Hollywood that Benjamin Levy Aguilar, who plays Officer Dante Torres, had been promoted to a series regular after first appearing as a guest-star during the previous season. The following month, it was revealed by Variety that Jesse Lee Soffer, who had portrayed Detective Jay Halstead since the series debut in 2014, would be leaving early in the tenth season. Soffer made his final appearance with the third episode of the season, "A Good Man", on October 5, 2022.

Release and marketing 
On May 16, 2022, it was revealed that the series would keep its Wednesday 10:00 PM ET timeslot, continuing to lead out of fellow Chicago franchise series Chicago Med and Chicago Fire. On June 29, 2022, the season was given a premiere date of September 21, 2022. After previously being available to stream on Hulu, all episodes from the season will begin streaming exclusively on Peacock the day after each episode airs on NBC.

Ratings

References

External links 

2022 American television seasons
2023 American television seasons
Chicago P.D. (TV series) seasons